Nutellagate was a controversy at Columbia University surrounding allegations of widespread student theft of dining hall Nutella. Columbia first began serving Nutella in its dining halls in February 2013. Within a month, future Pulitzer Prize winner Cecilia Reyes reported in the Columbia Daily Spectator that high demand for the spread was costing the university $5,000 per week, a figure reportedly calculated by Executive Director of Dining Services Vicki Dunn, as students were consuming up to 100 pounds of Nutella per day. In a school-wide email, Dunn accused students of filling cups with Nutella and stealing full jars from John Jay Dining Hall. It was estimated that at that rate, Nutella consumption would cost the university $250,000 a year, enough to buy seven jars for every undergraduate student. The high volume of Nutella consumption raised questions around food waste, dining hall meal plan costs, exorbitant tuition rates, and consumerism.

The story quickly garnered national attention, and was reported the next day in The New York Times. The student blog Bwog calculated based on the original figure from the Spectator—$5,000 per week for 100 pounds per day—that unless the Spectator had misreported the numbers, the university was being charged 70% more for its Nutella than prices offered by local distributors. Two days after the Spectator article, the university clarified in a statement titled "NUTELLA-GATE EXPOSED: It's a Smear!" that the weekly cost of Nutella was actually less than one-tenth the reported amount, and that while in the first week the university spent $2,500 on Nutella, the cost had actually fallen to around $450 in following weeks.

References 

History of Columbia University
Culture of Columbia University
2013 controversies in the United States
Food waste